The Adult Survivors Act (ASA) is a New York State law passed in May 2022 which amends the state's statute of limitations to allow alleged victims of sexual offenses such as sexual assault and unwanted sexual contact in the workplace to file civil suits between November 24, 2022, and November 24, 2023.

Notable cases 
On the day the law took effect, it was utilized by the writer E. Jean Carroll in expanding her litigation against businessman and politician Donald Trump from a defamation charge to one for battery as well.

References 

New York (state) law